Papatoetoe AFC is an amateur football club based in Papatoetoe, New Zealand. They currently compete in the NRF Championship, however, have enjoyed successful spells at the top of the New Zealand game, namely in the former National League, and having won two NRFL Premier League crowns.

History
Papatoetoe AFC was founded in 1959 through the efforts of Ken Hastings. The club entered the new Franklin & Districts competitions in 1960, competing from a site at the Papatoetoe Recreation Ground on Great South Road. In 1965 the club moved to its current home at Murdoch Park and the same year its senior team entered the Northern League. It gained promotion to the premier division in 1971, and it spent much of the next decade in either the lower reaches of the Premier League or the upper part of the second flight.

Papatoetoe have reached the Quarter-finals of the Chatham Cup on three occasions, in 1984, 1985, and 1986, but have yet to progress beyond this stage of the competition.

In 2022, the Reserves team won the NRF Knockout Cup.

References

External links
Official Club Website
Facebook Page

Association football clubs in Auckland
1959 establishments in New Zealand
Ōtara-Papatoetoe Local Board Area